Victor Andrade Santos (born 30 September 1995) is a Brazilian professional footballer who plays as a winger for Vila Nova.

Club career

Santos 
Born in Carmópolis, Sergipe, Victor Andrade joined Vitória's youth setup in 2005, aged 10. A year later he moved to Benfica in a trial basis, remaining in the club for a couple of months and appearing in youth tournaments with the Lisbon club. Due to his age, however, he returned to Brazil and signed for Santos in 2007.

In October 2011 he signed a three-year deal with Santos, with a buyout clause set at €50 million. Touted as a next Neymar by the media, he made his professional – and Série A – debut for Santos on 6 June 2012, aged only 16, replacing Alan Kardec in a 1–1 home draw against Fluminense. He went on to score 3 goals in 19 matches in his first season, most notably in a 2–0 home success against Cruzeiro where scored the first and assist another, receiving praise from Muricy Ramalho and Neymar for his performance.

Benfica 
Andrade appeared rarely in the following campaigns, and opted not to renew his contract with Santos. On 11 July 2014, he returned to Benfica, the incumbent title holders, penning a six-year contract and being assigned to the reserves in Segunda Liga. He made his debut on 17 September 2014, replacing Gonçalo Guedes on the 87th minute in a 2–2 home draw with Atlético CP. He scored his first goal on 5 October 2014, netting his side's second in a 2–2 away draw against Feirense, and ended the season with 32 appearances and four goals, including one to Porto B on 17 May 2015.

In 2015–16, Andrade remained assigned to Benfica B; until he received a call-up by Rui Vitória for the match against Estoril on 16 August. He made his debut for the first team against them and assisted Jonas for the 3–0 and also took part in the fourth goal, scored by Nélson Semedo. He played again against Arouca, and Moreirense, but was soon dropped again to the reserve team, as Rui Vitória favoured Gonçalo Guedes for his position. On 31 October, Benfica disclosed on their annual financial report, that Andrade had cost €3.94 million, mostly on agent fees. On 1 February 2016, he joined Vitória de Guimarães on loan until the end of the season. Five days later, he made his debut with Guimarães, and on 20 March, started his first game for them. In April, he was briefly assigned to Vitória Guimarães B. In June 2016, Andrade went on his second loan spell, joining German club 1860 Munich on a season-long deal.  On 27 October, he sustained a cruciate ligament rupture to his left knee and was sidelined for six months. He was only fit to play again in May 2017.

Estoril 
On 29 August 2017, Andrade moved to Estoril, penning a three-year deal. A year later, he returned to Brazil to play for Chapecoense, on a one-year loan deal.

Club statistics

Honours

Club 
Santos
Recopa Sudamericana: 2012

Benfica
Primeira Liga: 2015–16

Country 
Brazil U20
8 Nations International Tournament: 2012

References

External links 

1995 births
Living people
Brazilian footballers
Association football wingers
Esporte Clube Vitória players
Santos FC players
S.L. Benfica B players
S.L. Benfica footballers
Vitória S.C. players
TSV 1860 Munich players
G.D. Estoril Praia players
Associação Chapecoense de Futebol players
Goiás Esporte Clube players
Suwon FC players
Campeonato Brasileiro Série A players
Liga Portugal 2 players
Primeira Liga players
2. Bundesliga players
Brazilian expatriate footballers
Expatriate footballers in Portugal
Expatriate footballers in Germany
Expatriate footballers in South Korea
Brazilian expatriate sportspeople in Portugal
Brazilian expatriate sportspeople in Germany
Brazilian expatriate sportspeople in South Korea
People from Aracaju
Sportspeople from Sergipe